Malvor–Bottecchia was an Italian professional cycling team that was active between 1978 and 1990.

History
The team was led primarily by Dino Zandegù. The bike team did not operate in the 1987 season. It was primarily supplied bikes by Bottecchia, with the exception being the 1989 season. It collected thirteen stage wins in its history.

Notable riders
 Giuseppe Saronni 
 Lech Piasecki 
 Roberto Pagnin 
 Acacio da Silva Mora 
 Daniel Gisiger

Major wins

Major one-day races
Züri-Metzgete
1986 Acacio da Silva Mora 
Grand Prix des Nations
1978 Daniel Gisiger

Grand tours

Giro d'Italia
13 stages (1 in 1978, 1 in 1984, 4 in 1985, 2 in 1986, 4 in 1989 and 1 in 1990)

Vuelta a España
2 stages (2 in 1989)

Tour de France
2 stages (1 in 1982, 1 in 1986)

Other races
General classification - Tour de Suisse (1988) - Helmut Wechselberger
1 stage in the Tour de Suisse (1 in 1985)
4 stages in the Tour de Romandie (2 in 1978, 2 in 1985)
General classification - Vuelta a Andalucía (1985) - Fabio Bordonali
2 stages (1985)

References

Defunct cycling teams based in Italy
Cycling teams based in Italy
1978 establishments in Italy
1990 disestablishments in Italy
Cycling teams established in 1978
Cycling teams disestablished in 1990